Christina Wahlberg (born 24 July 1943) is a Swedish fencer. She competed in the women's individual foil event at the 1964 Summer Olympics.

References

External links
 

1943 births
Living people
Swedish female foil fencers
Olympic fencers of Sweden
Fencers at the 1964 Summer Olympics